Robert William Scheifler (born June 24, 1954) is an American computer scientist. He was born in Kirkwood, Missouri. He is most notable for leading the development of the X Window System from the project's inception in 1984 until the closure of the MIT X Consortium in 1996.  He later
became one of the architects of the Jini architecture at Sun Microsystems.

Scheifler holds a B.S. in Mathematics and an M.S. in computer science from the Massachusetts Institute of Technology.

References

External links
 Bob Scheifler, LinkedIn

1954 births
Living people
People from Kirkwood, Missouri
Massachusetts Institute of Technology School of Science alumni
X Window System people
Sun Microsystems people
Free software programmers
American computer programmers
American computer scientists
MIT School of Engineering alumni